WEBE (107.9 FM) is a commercial radio station licensed to Westport, Connecticut, carrying an adult contemporary format known as "WEBE108". Owned by Connoisseur Media, the station serves both the Greater New Haven and Fairfield County areas. The WEBE studios are located on Wheelers Farms Road in Milford; the station's transmitter is located on the Hi-Ho Tower on Video Lane in Shelton. In addition to a standard analog transmission, WEBE broadcasts in HD and is available online.

History
The frequency of 107.9 MHz was originally assigned by the Federal Communications Commission to Westport, Connecticut, under its Table of Allocations.  On September 1, 1962, WMMM-FM signed on the air as the FM counterpart to WMMM (now WSHU).  WMMM-AM-FM were owned by the Westport Broadcasting Company headed by Sydney J. Flamm.  WMMM was a daytimer station.  When it went off the air at sunset each evening, WMMM-FM allowed its programming to continue to be heard.

The stations broadcast out of offices and studios located above a deli at 163 Main Street in Westport.  The broadcasting antenna for 107.9 FM was located in a residential neighborhood in Wilton.  The power was 5,200 watts, a fraction of its current output, with an antenna height above average terrain (HAAT) of only 79 feet, so the broadcast radius of the station was quite limited.

In 1970, WMMM-FM got the new call sign WDJF.  The FM station continued to simulcast WMMM for a few more years, and would later switch to an automated adult contemporary format. The station's power was increased to 50,000 watts of power, and relocated to a taller tower.

In 1984, the station was acquired by a company known as "The 108 Radio Company Ltd. Partnership", and would switch the call letters to WEBE. In addition, automation was ended and live DJs handled most air shifts.  In 1987, the ownership changed to a company calling itself "WEBE Associates."  In 2000, ownership changed again, this time to Nassau Broadcasting LLC. Cumulus Media acquired Nassau Broadcasting in March 2002.   Cumulus also owned WICC.

On April 15, 2019, Cumulus Media announced that WEBE and WICC would be swapped to Connoisseur Media, which began operating the stations under a local marketing agreement (LMA) on May 1, 2019. The swap was consummated on June 26, 2019.

HD radio
Cumulus Broadcasting began upgrading its stations to HD Radio broadcasting in 2005. One of the first ten stations to get changed to HD transmission was WEBE.  WEBE's HD2 subchannel carries the talk format heard on co-owned WICC.

References

External links

History of Westport Connecticut Radio

EBE
Mainstream adult contemporary radio stations in the United States
Mass media in Bridgeport, Connecticut
Westport, Connecticut
Mass media in Fairfield County, Connecticut
Radio stations established in 1962
1962 establishments in Connecticut
Connoisseur Media radio stations